Gene Sheldon (born Eugene Hume; February 1, 1908 – May 1, 1982) was an American actor, mime artist, and musician. He is remembered as the mute servant Bernardo in Walt Disney's live-action Spanish Western series Zorro (1957-1959).

Biography and career
Born in Columbus, Ohio, Sheldon began acting at an early age, serving as stage assistant to his father Earl, a magician. His tasks included appearing as a girl, dressed appropriately but not speaking. He also gained experience as a radio announcer at age 17, broadcasting on Toledo, Ohio radio in 1925.

His film debut was in the 1934 movie Susie's Affairs, as Slug the Banjoist. The next year, he had a small part in the early Fred Astaire, Ginger Rogers musical Roberta as a banjo player in the film's band. In the musical number "Let's Begin", he had a short comedy scene tuning the banjo and he idanced in a comedy dance number with Fred Astaire and Candy Candido.

Sheldon appeared in the Broadway revue Priorities of 1942, performing a comedy banjo act in which he did not speak, wearing an outfit resembling the costume of silent film comedian Harry Langdon and mimicking some of Langdon's distinctive gestures.

He appeared in speaking roles as the genie Ali in 20th Century Fox's 1945 films Where Do We Go From Here? and the seal trainer, Professor Winnup in The Dolly Sisters.

In the 1950s and 1960s, most of Sheldon's work was on various Walt Disney programs. An often-seen act, in the "Golden Horseshoe Revue" episode of the Walt Disney anthology television series, was as a banjo player who kept getting his fingers stuck in the strings. After several minutes he would finally get them "un-stuck" and play a vigorous riff on his banjo.

His other speaking roles were banjoist Sam Jordan in the 1951 musical Golden Girl, notorious alcoholic Puffo the Clown in Paramount's 1954 film 3 Ring Circus and in Disney's 1960 film Toby Tyler as Sam Treat, a clown and animal trainer who is one of Toby's mentors and protectors.  Toby's other protector, gruff wagon driver Ben Cotter, was played by Henry Calvin, who co-starred on Zorro as Sergeant Garcia.

Sheldon starred in Disney's 1961 Christmas film Babes in Toyland as Barnaby's mute henchman, Roderigo. He was teamed with Calvin once more as a kind of ersatz Laurel and Hardy.

Zorro
Sheldon's role was Bernardo, Diego's mute (but not deaf) servant on Zorro. As established in the series' first episode, when Diego de la Vega confides to Bernardo his intention to pretend to be a helpless intellectual rather than a man of action, Bernardo decides to support him by pretending to be deaf. In this way, Bernardo is able to spy for Diego without arousing suspicion. This characterization, an innovation over the deaf-mute Bernardo of the original stories, employed Sheldon's pantomime skills while making the character more integral to the series. William Lava composed Bernardo's humorous music theme. Sheldon reprised the role in four further Zorro adventures that appeared on the Walt Disney anthology television series in 1960-1961.

Personal
Sheldon married Margaret McCann on December 11, 1944 in Las Vegas, Nevada. They had two children. He died from a heart attack. His remains were cremated.

Filmography

References

External links

1908 births
1982 deaths
American male television actors
Male actors from Columbus, Ohio
20th-century American male actors
American male film actors